The girls' singles tournament of the 2007 European Junior Badminton Championships was held from 4 to 8 April 2007. Janet Köhler from Germany clinched this title in the last edition.

Seeds 

  Karina Jørgensen (champion)
  Michelle Cheung (final)
  Mariya Martynenko (first round)
  Patty Stolzenbach (semi-finals)
  Anne Hald Jensen (second round)
  Kristína Ludíková (quarter-finals)
  Chloe Magee (second round)
  Linda Sloan (quarter-finals)

  Gabriela Banova (quarter-finals)
  Ezgi Epice (second round)
  Laura Molina (second round)
  Ksenia Polikarpova (second round)
  Mona Reich (third round)
  Victoria Slobodyanyuk (first round)
  Lianne Tan (third round)
  Yik-Man Wong (third round)

Draw

Finals

Top half

Section 1

Section 2

Bottom half

Section 3

Section 4

References

External links 
Tournament Link

2007 European Junior Badminton Championships